Aftertaste is the taste intensity of a food or beverage that is perceived immediately after that food or beverage is removed from the mouth. 

Aftertaste may also refer to:

Aftertaste (album), a 1997 album by Helmet
"Aftertaste", song by Ellie Goulding on the album Delirium
"Aftertaste", song by Loud Luxury
Aftertaste (TV series), 2021 Australian TV series